The 2019–20 Club América season was the club's 75th consecutive season in the top-flight of Mexican football. The team participated in the Liga MX, Campeón de Campeones, the Campeones Cup, and the CONCACAF Champions League.

Coaching staff

Players

Squad information

Players and squad numbers last updated on 19 January 2020.Note: Flags indicate national team as has been defined under FIFA eligibility rules. Players may hold more than one non-FIFA nationality.

Pre-season
Club América will precede their 2019–20 campaign with a series of friendlies to be contested in the United States. The matches were announced in June 2019.

Friendlies

Transfers

Summer

In

Out

Winter

In

Out

Competitions

Overview

Campeón de Campeones

2020 CONCACAF Champions League

Round of 16

Quarter-finals

Semi-finals

Campeones Cup

Apertura 2019

Matches

League table

Liguilla

Quarter-finals

Semi-finals

Final

Clausura 2020

Matches

League table

Notes

References

External links

Club América seasons
2019–20 Liga MX season
Mexican football clubs 2019–20 season
America